Lasiopetalum cenobium, is a species of flowering plant in the family Malvaceae and is endemic to a restricted part of the south-west of Western Australia. It is only known from the type location, not having been collected since 1918.

Description
Lasiopetalum cenobium has stems densely covered with woolly, star-shaped hairs. The upper surface of the leaves sparsely covered with white, star-shaped hairs and the lower surface densely covered with white and rust-coloured, star-shaped hairs.

Taxonomy
Lasiopetalum cenobium was first formally described in 2015 by Kelly Anne Shepherd and Carolyn F. Wilkins in the journal Nuytsia from specimens collected in New Norcia in 1918. The specific epithet (cenobium) means "monastery", referring to the monastic town of New Norcia where the only two known specimens were collected in 1918.

Distribution and habitat
This lasiopetalum is only known from two collections made in 1918 and recent searches made in the region have failed to located further specimens.

Conservation status
Lasiopetalum cenobium is listed as "Priority One" by the Government of Western Australia Department of Biodiversity, Conservation and Attractions, meaning that it is known from only one or a few locations which are potentially at risk.

References

cenobium
Malvales of Australia
Flora of Western Australia
Plants described in 2015